The Woodville Republican is a weekly newspaper published in Woodville, Wilkinson County, Mississippi. It is the oldest newspaper, as well as the oldest business, in continuous incorporated operation in Mississippi.

The Woodville Republican was established in 1823 by William A. A. Chisholm. The name predates, and is unrelated to, the present-day Republican Party.

The Lewis family has owned and operated the Republican since 7 June 1879. As of 2010 the editor is Andy J. Lewis. Issues of the Woodville Republican come out on Wednesdays.

References 

1823 establishments in Mississippi
History of Mississippi
Newspapers published in Mississippi
Publications established in 1823
Wilkinson County, Mississippi